Ma Chung University is private university in Indonesia, located at Villa Puncak Tidar N-01, City of Malang, East Java. The university is owned by Harapan Bangsa Sejahtera Foundation.

History 

The name of Ma Chung comes from former Peranakan Chinese-owned high school at Malang in 1950s. The initial idea of establishing Ma Chung University was sparked during the Grand Reunion in commemoration of the 55th anniversary of Ma Chung high school in September 2001 at Xiamen, China. Based on "when you drink water, think of its source, to not forget one's roots or heritage" traditional chinese proverb, on 1 May 2004, the Ma Chung College was established as the initial step in the establishment of Ma Chung University, which was founded by Mochtar Riady, a Chinese-Indonesian billionaire, and other fourteen notable Ma Chung High School alumni (Soegeng Hendarto, Teguh Kinarto, Hendro Sunjoto, Koentjoro Loekito, Effendy Sudargo, Agus Chandra, Hadi Widjojo, Nuryati Tanuwidjaya, Nehemja, Alex Lesmana Samudra, Evelyn Adam, Usman Harsono, Nagawidjaja Winoto, and Soebroto Wirotomo):

At the Grand Reunion in commemoration of the 60th Anniversary of Ma Chung High School in Malang, 17 July 2005, laid the first stone in the construction of Ma Chung University and the Harapan Bangsa Sejahtera Foundation was formed which houses Ma Chung University. Senior alumni namely Prof. Dr. Yang Zhiling and Prof. Dr. Bin Ling gave many proposals regarding the development and management of the university. His proposal was then used as the first stepping stone for planning (blue print) by the leaders of Ma Chung University. On 7 July 2007, attended by thousands of school alumni, Ma Chung University was officially opened.

Four years later, on September 17, 2011, the University inaugurated its first Professor, Patrisius Istiarto Djiwandono as a Professor in Learning and Research Methodology.

Faculties and Departments

Faculty of Economics and Business
Department of International Business Management
Department of Business Accounting

Faculty of Science and Technology
Department of Business Information System
Department of Informatics Engineering
Department of Visual Communication Design
Department of Pharmacy
Department of Chemical Engineering
Department of Industrial Engineering

Faculty of Language and Art
Department of English Literature
Department of Mandarin Chinese Business Language and Culture

Partnership 
On July 7, 2014, Ma Chung University signed partnership with Taiwan investors, to fund department of business information technology research and development (with Malang Digital Core community).

Rectors

References

External links 
 Official Website of Ma Chung University

Universities in Indonesia
Universities in East Java
Educational institutions established in 2007
Private universities and colleges in Indonesia
2007 establishments in Indonesia